Mike Richards (born Mike Rehill  in Stouffville, Ontario) is a Canadian radio broadcaster with a long history in sports radio. Previously associated with The Fan 590 in Toronto and The Fan 960 in Calgary, he was announced in January 2011 as the first major personality hired for TSN Radio 1050 and the national TSN Radio network, where he was a morning host. Richards left TSN Radio in 2016.

Since 2017, Richards has hosted The Raw Mike Richards Show daily podcast.

Richards is joining Sauga 960 AM in Mississauga as the station's morning host beginning January 7, 2019.

References

External links
 
The Raw Mike Richards Show

Canadian impressionists (entertainers)
Canadian sports talk radio hosts
Living people
People from Newmarket, Ontario
People from Whitchurch-Stouffville
Canadian podcasters
Canadian talk radio hosts
Year of birth missing (living people)